The PGA Grand Slam of Golf was an annual off-season golf tournament contested from 1979 until 2014 when the tournament was cancelled. It was contested by the year's winners of the four major championships of regular men's golf, which are the Masters Tournament, the U.S. Open, The Open Championship (British Open), and the PGA Championship. It was one of several invitational events for leading male golfers held each year after the PGA Tour and the European Tour seasons had concluded. The competition was organized by the PGA of America and the prize money did not count toward the PGA Tour money list.

The tournament was staged since 1979 with a couple of short breaks. Beginning in 1991, it was played as a two-day, 36-hole stroke play competition, except in 1998 and 1999, when it was played at match play. From 1979 to 1990, it was played as a one-day, 18-hole stroke play competition. If a player won more than one major in a calendar year or a player declined the invitation to play, the PGA of America filled the four-man field by inviting the former major winner(s) with the best overall finishes in that year's majors.

Initially the PGA Grand Slam of Golf was played at a different golf course each year, but from 1994 to 2006, it was played at the Poipu Bay Golf Course in Koloa, Hawaii on the island of Kauai. The tournament in Hawaii allowed the event to be televised in prime-time American television with live coverage because of the time difference.

In 2007, the tournament moved to the Mid Ocean Club in Bermuda and it was played in mid-October, reflecting the earlier end to the main part of the PGA Tour season after the introduction of the FedEx Cup. In 2009, the event stayed in Bermuda but moved to the Port Royal Golf Course.

The final prize fund was $1.35 million, of which $600,000 went to the winner. This was the lowest first prize some of the competitors have played for all year, but on the other hand there was a guaranteed $200,000 for coming in last. From 1991 to 2005, the prize fund was $1 million, of which $400,000 went to the winner. In 2006, the purse was $1.25 million, with $500,000 going to the winner.

In the 2004 tournament at Poipu Bay Golf Course, Phil Mickelson shot a 59 in the second round.

The 1986–90 tournaments were played at Kemper Lakes Golf Club in Hawthorn Woods, Illinois, site of the PGA Championship in 1989.

The event was to be moved to Trump National Golf Club in Rancho Palos Verdes, California for the 2015 contest, but on July 7, 2015 the PGA announced that the 2015 event will not be played at the course due to outcry over comments that course owner Donald Trump made about Latino immigrants. After being unable to find a suitable replacement venue, the 2015 event was canceled.

In March 2016, the event was discontinued altogether after the PGA of America concluded it no longer fit in "today's golf landscape."

World Series of Golf
The year's four major champions in a 36-hole event was previously applied at the original "World Series of Golf," played from 1962 through 1975 at the South Course of Firestone Country Club in Akron, Ohio. Held in early September, Jack Nicklaus won four of the fourteen events, including the first two, and was runner-up in six. All editions had a winner's share of $50,000, a substantial prize in its early years, significantly more than a major. The event changed to a limited field PGA Tour event in 1976 and continues as the WGC-Bridgestone Invitational.

Courses

Results

Note: a=alternate
b=Mike Ditka replaced Curtis Strange due to illness.

Multiple winners
Five golfers have won the event more than once:
Tiger Woods – 7 wins: 1998, 1999, 2000, 2001, 2002, 2005, 2006
Greg Norman – 3 wins: 1986, 1993, 1994
Andy North – 2 wins: 1979, 1990
Jim Furyk – 2 wins: 2003, 2008
Ernie Els – 2 wins: 1997, 2010

References

External links
Coverage on the PGA of America's site
PGA of America Media Guide Coverage for all years
Port Royal Golf Club (Official site of 2009–12 Grand Slam course)

PGA Tour unofficial money events
Golf in Hawaii
Golf in Bermuda
Golf in California
Recurring sporting events established in 1979